Begum Majeeda Wyne is a Pakistani politician who was a member of the National Assembly of Pakistan, from 1997 to 1999 and again from June 2013 to May 2018.

Family
She was the wife of Ghulam Haider Wyne, former Chief Minister of Punjab.

Political career
She ran for the seat of the National Assembly of Pakistan as a candidate of Pakistan Muslim League (N) (PML-N) from Constituency NA-123 (Khanewal-III) in 1993 Pakistani general election but was unsuccessful. She received 50,454 votes and lost the seat to Aslam Bodla.

She was elected to the National Assembly as a candidate of PML-N from Constituency NA-123 (Khanewal-III) in 1997 Pakistani general election. She received 68,701 votes and defeated Aslam Bodla.

She was re-elected to the National Assembly as a candidate of PML-N on reserved seats for women from Punjab in 2013 Pakistani general election.

References

Living people
Pakistan Muslim League (N) politicians
Punjabi people
Pakistani MNAs 2013–2018
Women members of the National Assembly of Pakistan
Year of birth missing (living people)
Pakistani MNAs 1997–1999
21st-century Pakistani women politicians